Thermonectus sibleyi is a species of diving beetle native to western Mexico and southern Arizona, United States.

References

Dytiscidae
Beetles of North America
Beetles described in 1981